Brazos Santiago Pass is a natural coastal landform located in the Lower Laguna Madre and Lower Rio Grande Valley on the furthest southern beach terrain of the Texas Gulf Coast. The seacoast passage is interpolated by barrier islands encompassing the southern Brazos Island and the northern South Padre Island.

The jetty harbor development sustains the passage entrance from coastal erosion, coastal sediment transport, longshore drift, and sandbank shoals.

US coastal navigability development of Brazos Santiago pass
The Rivers and Harbors Act established a declaration of governance for the natural waterway of the Brazos Santiago Pass. The Act of Congress granted coastal engineering, coastal management, and public works projects for the natural inland waterway during the late nineteenth century to the twentieth century.

The Brazos Island and South Padre Island landform development proposals were endorsed by the United States Army Corps of Engineers sustaining the beach evolution at the Brazos Island Harbor natural inlet.

Navigation lights of Brazos Santiago pass
In 1850, the 31st United States Congress authorized the Lighthouse Service Act as enacted into law by 13th President of the United States Millard Fillmore on September 28, 1850. In 1851, the United States Lighthouse Board was convened as a quasi-military board fostering guardianship as applicable toterrestrial navigation services for maritime transport by the United States Lighthouse Service.  

In 1853, a nautical beacon was initially established on South Padre Island with a proximity to the Brazos Island Military Depot originally entitled Fort Polk during the Mexican–American War. The navigation beacon had a  vertical height situated on a square platform with a  width. The structural design was constructed of wood equipped with a square copper lantern hoisted by block and tackle to the pinnacle. The beacon was visually completed with  artillery wheels secured to a  oak axletree for to and fro mobility on the barrier island coastline.

In 1879, a screw-pile lighthouse was established in the intertidal zone of the Lower Laguna Madre with a geographic proximity to the Brazos Santiago Pass. The deep foundation architecture was acknowledged as a notable landmark sight for sixty years within the Texas international boundary region of the Lower Rio Grande Valley coast. The foundation was developed with screw piles anchored into the estuarial seabed of the Lower Laguna Madre. The upper quarters were structured as a 1½ storey hexagonal Cape Cod style cottage built of timbers completed with a fourth-order fresnel lens located at the pinnacle.

{
  "type": "Feature",
  "geometry": { "type": "Point", "coordinates": [-97.16633, 26.07176] },
  "properties": {
    "title": "Brazos Santiago Screw-Pile Lighthouse",
    "marker-color": "cc5500",
    "marker-size": "medium",
    "marker-symbol": "lighthouse"
  }
}

Station Brazos and US Life Saving Service 
In 1878, the United States Life Saving Service Act authorized the creation of a coastal life saving station near the navigable strait of the Brazos Island Harbor. The Station Brazos was constructed in 1881 and governed by the United States Life-Saving Service.

Texas Historical Commission site
The Brazos Santiago Pass received a historical marker in 1996 by the Texas Historical Commission establishing a momentous narrative for the south Texas coastal dominion during the nineteenth century.

See also
 Great Texas Coastal Birding Trail
 Ingham incident
 Laguna Atascosa National Wildlife Refuge
 Lower Rio Grande Valley National Wildlife Refuge
 Palo Alto Battlefield National Historical Park

References

Marine archaeology bibliography

External links
 
 
 
 
 
 
 
 

Ports and harbors of Texas
Ship canals
Canals in Texas
Bodies of water of the Gulf of Mexico
Transportation in Cameron County, Texas